This is a list of Christian worship music artists or bands. This list includes notable artists or bands that have recorded or been known to perform contemporary worship music at some point in their careers. This includes worship leaders, Christian songwriters, and contemporary Christian music artists. It is not a list of contemporary Christian music artists alone.

Bands are listed by the first letter in their name, excluding the words "a", "an", or "the", and individuals are listed by family name.

Artists

A
 All Sons & Daughters
 Coffey Anderson
 Meredith Andrews
 Ascend the Hill
 Cory Asbury
 Audrey Assad
 Austin Stone Worship

B
 Josh Baldwin
 Paul Baloche
 Jon Bauer
 Marco Barrientos
 Vicky Beeching
 The Belonging Co
 Bethel Music
 Big Daddy Weave
 Charles Billingsley
 Bluetree
 Dante Bowe
 Lincoln Brewster
 Bright City
 Brenton Brown
 Clint Brown
 Fernanda Brum
 Bryan & Katie Torwalt
 Building 429
 Bukas Palad Music Ministry
 Jon Buller

C
 Byron Cage
 Adam Cappa
 Caedmon's Call
 Jeremy Camp
 Carman (singer)
 Cody Carnes 
 Christ for the Nations Music
 The City Harmonic
 Citipointe Worship
 Citizens & Saints
 Amanda Cook
 Travis Cottrell
 Crowder
 David Crowder Band
 Casting Crowns

D

 Lauren Daigle
 Hope Darst
 Diante do Trono
 Delirious?
 Desperation Band
 Jeff Deyo
 The Digital Age
 Kristene DiMarco
 Christine D'Clario
 Brian Doerksen

E
 Elevation Worship
 Misty Edwards
 Darrell Evans

F
 Ludmila Ferber
 Lou Fellingham
 FFH
 Finding Favour
 Don Francisco
 Brooke Fraser
 Austin French
 Marine Friesen

G
 Rob Galea
 Gateway Worship
 Maryanne J. George
 Keith Getty
 Aaron Gillespie
 Matt Gilman
 The Glorious Unseen
 Steffany Gretzinger
 Keith Green
 Michael Gungor

H
 Deitrick Haddon
 Charlie Hall
 Fred Hammond
 Mark Harris
 Harvest
 Brandon Heath
 Hillsong United
 Hillsong Young & Free
 Hillsong Worship
 Israel Houghton
 Housefires
 Joel Houston
 Tim Hughes

J
 Jesus Culture
 Kari Jobe
 Brian Johnson
 Jenn Johnson
 Jonathan David & Melissa Helser
 Julissa

K
 Glenn Kaiser
 The Katinas
 Graham Kendrick
 Dustin Kensrue
 Kings Kaleidoscope
 Kutless
 Ron Kenoly

L
 Brandon Lake
 Lenny LeBlanc
 Leeland
 Crystal Lewis
 Brian Littrell
 Loud Harp
 The LUKAS Band
 LIFE Worship

M
 Matthew West
 Matt Maher
 Maranatha! Singers
 Robin Mark
 William Matthews
 Maverick City Music
 The McClures
 Heath McNease
 MercyMe
 Don Moen
 Danilo Montero
 Chandler Moore 
 Mosaic MSC

N
 Ana Nóbrega
 Newsboys
 NewSong
 NewSpring Worship
 New Life Worship
 Katy Nichole
 Christy Nockels

O
 One Sonic Society
 Fernando Ortega
 The O.C. Supertones

P
 Parachute Band
 Twila Paris
 Andy Park
 Laura Hackett Park
 Alexis Peña
 Petra
 Phatfish
 Phillips, Craig and Dean
 Planetboom
 Matt Price
 Kevin Prosch
 Planetshakers

Q
 Chris Quilala

R
 Naomi Raine 
 Matt Redman
 Rend Collective
 Jeremy Riddle
 Gabriela Rocha
 Rock n Roll Worship Circus
 Jesus Adrian Romero

S
 Israel Salazar
 Nívea Soares
 Torrey Salter
 Sanctus Real
 Juliano Son
 Rebecca St. James
 Kathryn Scott
 Seventh Day Slumber
 Beckah Shae
 Shane & Shane
 Aaron Shust
 Sidewalk Prophets
 Manfred Siebald
 Sinach
 Sixteen Cities
 Skillet
 Chris Sligh
 Martin Smith
 Michael W. Smith
 Sonicflood
 Starfield
 Laura Story

T
 Tenth Avenue North
 Third Day
 Chris Tomlin
 Stuart Townend
 Hunter G. K. Thompson
 Jon Thurlow
 Randy Travis
 Tribl

U
 United Pursuit
 Jason Upton

V
 Ana Paula Valadão
 André Valadão
 Mariana Valadão
 Jaci Velasquez
 Vertical Church Band
 Victory Worship

W
 Kim Walker-Smith
 Tommy Walker
 John Waller
 Watermark
 Wayne Watson
 Waterdeep
 We Are Messengers
 Steven Welch
 Evan Wickham
 Phil Wickham
 Paul Wilbur
 Kelly Willard
 Zach Williams
 Josh Wilson
 Marcos Witt
 Worth Dying For

Y
 Young Oceans

Z
 Darlene Zschech

See also 
 List of Christian bands and artists by genre

Worship
Worship